Vank, Azerbaijan may refer to:
Vəng (disambiguation), several places in Azerbaijan
Vəngli, Azerbaijan